The Marathon is a 1919 American short comedy film starring Harold Lloyd. A print of the film survives in the film archive at George Eastman House.

Plot
Bebe is besieged by suitors who want to take her to watch a local marathon.  Bebe's father, a former heavyweight boxer, scares off all the suitors but Snub who wins him over by offering him a cigar.  Not long afterward, Harold arrives to woo Bebe too.  He gets into a scuffle with both Snub and Bebe's father.  The police are summoned.  Harold flees Bebe's house in a hurry and becomes entangled among the marathon runners who also angrily pursue him.

Cast
 Harold Lloyd
 Snub Pollard
 Bebe Daniels
 Sammy Brooks
 Lew Harvey
 Wallace Howe
 Gus Leonard
 Gaylord Lloyd
 Marie Mosquini
 Fred C. Newmeyer
 William Petterson
 Dorothea Wolbert
 Noah Young

See also
 Harold Lloyd filmography

References

External links

1919 films
1919 short films
1919 comedy films
American silent short films
American black-and-white films
Films directed by Alfred J. Goulding
Silent American comedy films
American comedy short films
1910s American films